The 1952 Yugoslav First Basketball League season is the 8th season of the Yugoslav First Basketball League, the highest professional basketball league in SFR Yugoslavia.

Regular season

West

Play off

Winning Roster  
The winning roster of Crvena Zvezda:
  Borislav Ćurčić
  Ladislav Demšar
  Aleksandar Gec
  Srđan Kalember
  Dragan Godžić
  Milan Bjegojević
  Branko Nešić
  Đorđe Andrijašević
  Borko Jovanović

Coach:  Nebojša Popović

External links  
 Yugoslav First Basketball League Archive 

1952